= Friendly Games =

In the world of sports, "friendly games" may refer to:

- The Commonwealth Games, commonly referred to as the Friendly Games
- Any form of exhibition game
